Namoo Actors Co. Ltd., founded in 2004, is a talent management agency based in Seoul, South Korea. The founder and president of the company is Kim Jong-do.

History
In 2004, Namoo Actors was established under the name "Namoo Actors Co. Ltd.". The company signed Song Ji-hyo, Kim Kang-woo, Kim Tae-hee and Kim Hye-na in 2005. Namoo celebrated their 10th anniversary party at CGV Cine City in Seoul on 10 January 2014. On February 21, Namoo Actors (Kim Jong-do and actors), family members, and fans held a memorial service for actress Lee Eun-ju, who died on 22 February 2005, in Seoul.

Partnerships

In 2006, Kim Jong-do and actors attended the Busan International Film Festival and in 2007, signed a joint-network deal with China's Chengtian.

Current actors

Males
Cha Seo-won
Kang Ki-young (2020–present)
Kim Hye-seong
Kim Jung-hwan
Ko Woo-rim
Lee Joon-gi (2014–present)
Lee Jeong-ha (The Unit contestant)
Lee Jung-shik
Lee Sin-seong 
Lee Tae-sun
Oh Hyun-joong
Oh Seung-hoon
Park Sun-ho (2022–present)
Song Kang
Yoo Jun-sang

Females
Chae Bin
Do Ji-won
Hong Eun-hee
Jo Woo-ri (2022–present)
Kim Ha-na
Kim Hwan-hee
Kim Hyo-jin (2006–present)
Kim Jae-kyung (2016–present)
Lee Na-eun (2022–present)
Lee Yoon-ji (2009–present)
Lee Yul-eum
Park Eun-bin (2015–present)
Park Ji-hyun
Roh Jeong-eui
Seo Ye-hwa
Seohyun (2019–present)
Shin So-hyun

Former actors
 Baek Do-bin  (2010–2015)
 Baek Yoon-sik (2010–2018) 
 Chun Woo-hee (2011–2021)
 Han Hye-jin (2008–2017)
 Jeon Hye-bin (2009–2018)
 Ji Sung (2010–2021)
 Jo Dong-hyuk (2004–2014)
 Jo Han-chul (2013–2018)
 Joo Hae-eun
 Kim Ah-joong (2011–2015)
 Kim Hyang-gi (2011-2021)
 Kim Ji-soo (2004–2020)
 Kim Joo-hyuk (2004–2017; worked with Kim Jong-do since 1997)
 Kim Kang-woo (2005–2014)
 Kim So-yeon (2006–2018)
 Kim Tae-hee (2005–2010)
 Lee Eugene (Produce X 101 contestant)
 Lee Eun-ju (2005)
 Lee Kyu-han (?–2014)
 Lee You-jin (2017–2020)
 Moon Chae-won (2016–2021)
 Moon Geun-young (2004–2020)
 Nam Gyu-ri (2013–2014)
 Park Gun-hyung (2004–2017)
 Park Min-young (2017–2021)
 Park Sang-wook (2004–2016)
 Song Ji-hyo (2005–2011)
 Yoo Ji-tae (2013–2018)
 Yoo Sun (2012–2016)
 Yoon Je-moon (2012–2019)
 Shin Se-kyung (2004–2021)

See also
 Fantagio
 KeyEast
 SidusHQ

References

External links
 
 Naver Post 

Entertainment companies established in 2004
South Korean companies established in 2004
Companies based in Seoul
Talent agencies of South Korea